Thomas Gardener (died 1408/09), of Dorchester, Dorset, was an English politician.

Family
He was married to a woman named Petronilla.

Career
He was a Member (MP) of the Parliament of England for Dorchester in September 1388 and 1393.

References

14th-century births
1409 deaths
English MPs September 1388
Members of the Parliament of England for Dorchester
English MPs 1393